USS Shelter (AM-301) was an  built for the United States Navy during World War II. After service in the Pacific during World War II, Shelter was decommissioned in June 1946 and placed in reserve. In January 1964, she was transferred to South Vietnam for service in the Republic of Vietnam Navy as RVNS Chi Linh (HQ-11). She remained in South Vietnamese service until the collapse of that country in 1975. Chi Linh was one of several ships that fled from South Vietnam to the Philippines. She was then commissioned into the Philippine Navy in April 1976 as RPS Datu Tupas (PS-18), named after a chieftain of Cebu. The ship's fate is not reported in secondary sources.

U.S. Navy service 
Shelter was laid down on 16 August 1943 by Winslow Marine Railway and Shipbuilding Company of Winslow, Washington. The ship was launched on 14 November 1943, sponsored by Miss Patricia Whittenberg, and commissioned on 9 July 1944.

Shelter conducted shakedown training at San Pedro and sailed from San Francisco on 21 October as escort unit for a convoy which entered Pearl Harbor on 30 October. Returned to San Francisco escorting merchant ships. On Thanksgiving Day, Shelter left San Francisco and returned to Pearl Harbor. After assault minesweeping exercises off Maui she departed Pearl Harbor on 5 January with an amphibious assault force, which Shelter escorted to Saipan.

Shelter then continued to Tinian for supplies and then escorted USS Guide, flagship of COMMINEPAC to Iwo Jima that arrived off the island on 16 February 1945. She made pre-invasion sweeps with Mine Division 36 consisting of six ships, which were ordered to fire on shore, and to retire if fire returned which it did, possibly because one of the other ships destroyed a Japanese radar emplacement. A larger ship then attacked the revealed emplacements. Troops stormed ashore on 19 February and the Shelter remained on patrol and screening station until 28 February; then helped guard an amphibious (damaged LSTs) group to Saipan before proceeding to Ulithi, Western Caroline Islands, arriving on 9 March for logistics and preparations for the coming Okinawa campaign. At an unknown time prior to Okinawa, USS Shelter was refitted to add a combat operations center, which replaced the captain's bunk on the bridge (one level below the flying bridge). This was a possible reason for recommissioning in 1964. Shelter had only surface radar, so incoming flights were relayed with a bearing and the estimated time until arrival from a point ashore. This was converted to a bearing and time to arrival at Shelter and relayed from Shelter to the other ships in the battle group.

On 19 March 1945, Shelter departed Ulithi with Mine Group 2 for exploratory sweeps in the Kerama Retto area, and the western side of Okinawa, from 26 March until the initial invasion landings on 1 April. Division 36 also, on D-Day minus one, destroyed mines at the landing site with gunfire, being too shallow to sweep. She made assault sweeps at Ie Shima on 8 and 14 April, served on antisubmarine patrol, and departed on 4 May for Ulithi, thence to San Pedro Bay, Leyte, Philippine Islands. Lieutenant Lancaster then assumed command. Here, she joined a convoy which reached Okinawa on the 29th. The following three weeks were largely taken up with sweeping of minefields off Myako Jima in the East China Sea. She stood out of Kerama Retto on 8 July 1945 as escort unit for LST Group 45 which entered San Pedro Bay on 13 July, and departed Leyte Gulf on 19 August with a convoy that reached Okinawa on the 24th. Six days later, she sailed with a minesweeping task unit that swept the Arcadia minefields in the Yellow Sea in preparation for the landing of occupation forces on the Korean peninsula by the Ninth Fleet on 7 September 1945. She then proceeded to the western coast of Kyushu, Japan, for minesweeping in approaches to Nagasaki and Sasebo, where Lieutenant Douglas Giddings assumed command, clearing 22 moored mines and obstructions from 9 to 16 September 1945.

Shelter departed Nagasaki on 26 September 1945 for repairs at Sasebo, then spent 11 to 17 October sweeping 83 Japanese mines in the Tsushima Strait. She repeated this operation 1 to 12 November, sweeping 69 more mines; then became reference ship for a unit of three Japanese Coastal Defense ships sweeping shallow mines line southeast of Tsushima until 16 November 1945. She joined Mine Squadron Twelve on 27 November acting as reference ship until completion of sweeping operations in Tsushima Strait on 4 December 1945. She departed Wakayama, Japan, for home on 11 December touching Eniwetok, Pearl Harbor, and San Diego, where LT JG Samuel F. Melcher Jr assumed command on her way to Galveston, Texas, arriving on 3 February 1946. She shifted to Orange, Texas on 5 April, was decommissioned there by Lt (Jg) John Redmond on 7 June 1946, and placed in the Texas Group, United States Atlantic Reserve Fleet. Shelter received six battle stars for service in World War II.

While she remained in reserve, her hull classification was changed from AM-301 to MSF-301 on 7 February 1955. The ship remained in reserve until 15 July 1963 when she commenced conversion to a patrol and escort craft in the Philadelphia Naval Shipyard. She was struck from the Navy List on 1 August 1963 and was transferred on loan to the government of South Vietnam on 24 January 1964, under terms of the Military Assistance Program.

Republic of Vietnam Navy service 
On 24 January 1964, the former Shelter was transferred to South Vietnam. She served in the Republic of Vietnam Navy as RVNS Chi Linh (HQ-11). After the fall of South Vietnam in 1975, she was one of several ships that escaped to the Philippines and were later commissioned into the Philippine Navy.

Philippine Navy service 
Renamed RPS Datu Tupas (PS-18) in honor of Datu Tupas, a chieftain of Cebu, the vessel was commissioned into the Philippine Navy on 5 April 1976. Magat Salamat differed slightly from other ships of the Migual Malvar class because of minor structural differences from her original construction and weapons complement.

The ship's fate is not reported in secondary sources. If she remained in commission beyond July 1980, when the Philippine Navy changed their ship prefix from RPS to BRP, the ship would have become BRP Datu Tupas at that time.

Gallery

Notes

References

External links 
 
Janes Fighting Ships of Vietnam

Admirable-class minesweepers
Ships built in Winslow, Washington
1943 ships
World War II minesweepers of the United States
Admirable-class minesweepers of the Republic of Vietnam Navy
Vietnam War naval ships of South Vietnam
Admirable-class minesweepers of the Philippine Navy
Miguel Malvar-class corvettes